Hosilot Farkhor (Ҳосилот Фархор) is a football club from Farkhor, Tajikistan.

History

Names
1991–1994: Hosilot Farkhor
1995–1997: FC Farkhor
2003: SKA-Khatlon Farkhor
2004–2005: FC Farkhor
2010–present: Hosilot Farkhor

Domestic history

Khosilot withdrew because of political reasons

Continental history

Honours

Team
 Tajik Supercup (1) 2017

References

External links
Soccerway.com profile
ЧЕМПИОНАТ ТАДЖИКИСТАНА. 

Football clubs in Tajikistan
Military association football clubs